Allen Webster Brown (July 22, 1908 - January 19, 1990) was the fifth Bishop of Albany in the United States from 1961 to 1974, during turbulent times from the 1960s to the drafting of the new Book of Common Prayer.

Early life
Brown graduated from the Philadelphia Divinity School with his degree in divinity.  He was ordained a priest in 1934.  He worked at several parishes in the diocese of Albany in the 1940s, including in Hudson and Copake Falls, before he became Dean of the Cathedral of All Saints  He was married to the former Helen Belshaw.

Work as Bishop
Brown was elected Suffragan Bishop of Albany in October 1958, to assist the incumbent, Frederick L. Barry, Bishop of Albany. He was consecrated on February 22, 1959, at St. John's Church, Ogdensburg, by Arthur C. Lichtenberger, Presiding Bishop.  In 1960, Barry died in a hospital after some time in ill health, and the see was left vacant.  Brown was elected and consecrated bishop in 1961.  In 1963, he requested the election of a new Suffragan bishop; Charles Bowen Persell, Jr., his only close competitor in the 1958 race, was thereafter elected.

Brown travelled widely though the 19-county diocese to confirm parishioners, to ordain priests,  and to preach.

He retired as Bishop of Albany in 1974, and died in 1990 at the age of 81.

See also

 List of Episcopal bishops (U.S.)

References

External links
 Cathedral of All Saints web site
 Episcopal Diocese of Albany official web site

Anglo-Catholic bishops
Religious leaders from Albany, New York
1909 births
1990 deaths
American Anglo-Catholics
20th-century American Episcopalians
Episcopal bishops of Albany
20th-century American clergy